Various traditions are practiced on certain days of the year in Wales both currently and historically, including festivities originating in Welsh, Celtic, English and Christian cultures.

History
As recorded in the Laws of Hywel Dda, the three main holidays (gwyliau) of the medieval Welsh kingdoms were Christmas (Nadolig), Easter (Pasg), and Whitsuntide (Sulgwyn).

Other important holidays were the feasts of St Patrick (Gwyl Badric) on 17 March; St. Quiricus (Gwyl Giric) on 16 June; the Beheading of John the Baptist (called in Welsh Gwyl Ieuan y Moch  St. John of the Swine  as it was the day the pigs were turned out into the woods to forage through the winter) on 29 August; St Michael (Gwyl Fihangel) on 29 September; and the Calends of Winter (Calan Gaeaf) on 1 November, All Saints' Day (yr Holl Saint). A special drink called the "liquor of the Apostles" (gwirawd yr ebestyl) was brewed for and distributed on these saints' days.

Modern celebrations calendar

Festivals no longer widely celebrated 
These are festivals that were once widely celebrated in Wales but are no longer so.

Gŵyl Fair y Canhwyllau, or Candlemas, usually on the 2 February, literally translates as "Mary's Festival of the Candles" marks the presentation of Jesus at the Temple. It is based upon the account of the presentation of Jesus in Luke 2:22–40. It falls on the 40th day (postpartum period) of and the conclusion of the Christmas–Epiphany season.

Whitsun, or the celebration of Pentecost, is a traditional Church festival that was observed with a statutory bank holiday in late May. The link with the formal Whitsun date (which moves with Easter) was broken and replaced by a late May bank holiday fixed to the end of the month.

Locally, each parish celebrated a Gŵyl Mabsant in commemoration of its native saint. This annual celebration developed from a dedication through prayer to a programme of recreational activities.

Calan Mai (or Calan Haf) is a May Day celebration on 1 May, marking the first day of summer, and one of the traditional fire festivals.

Gŵyl Ifan (St John's Day) on the 24 June is otherwise known as Midsummer's day.

References

 
Holidays